The Ministry of Transport (MOT; ;) is a ministry of the Government of Singapore responsible for the administration and regulation of land, sea and air transportation in Singapore.

History 
The Ministry of Transport was formed on 23 November 2001 out of the then Ministry of Communications and Information Technology. Its previous portfolio of information technology and telecommunications were then transferred to the then Ministry of Information, Communications and The Arts, now known as the Ministry of Communications and Information.

Organisational structure
Currently, the ministry commissions and regulates four individual government statutory boards: the Civil Aviation Authority of Singapore (CAAS), the Land Transport Authority (LTA), the Maritime and Port Authority of Singapore (MPA) and the Public Transport Council (PTC), which implement the ministry’s policies and tactical directions.

The Ministry has seven divisions with staff strength of slightly more than 100 staff. These are Air Transport Division, Land Transport Division, Sea Transport Division, International Relations and Security Division, Corporate Communications Division, Corporate Development Division and the Air Accident Investigation Bureau of Singapore (AAIB).

Statutory Boards

Civil Aviation Authority of Singapore 
Land Transport Authority 
Maritime and Port Authority of Singapore 
Public Transport Council

Ministers
The Ministry is headed by the Minister for Transport, who is appointed as part of the Cabinet of Singapore. The incumbent minister is S. Iswaran from the People's Action Party.

Interim ministers

See also

 Ministry of Transport

References

External links

 

Transport
Transport in Singapore
Singapore
2001 establishments in Singapore
Singapore